Opal Property Group Limited, often referred to as Opal, was a company based in the United Kingdom which operates a number of large property developments in UK cities, targeted at students and private renters. Founded in 1998 by Stuart Wall, Opal was the largest provider of private student accommodation in the UK, providing accommodation for 20,000 students. The company went into administration in 2013 and its properties were transferred to other organisations.

History
The company was founded in 1998.

2013
In March 2013, the company reported that one of its subsidiaries, Ocon Construction, was to be put into administration. The parent company Opal may be broken up if loan extensions with the banks cannot be agreed.

13 further Opal property subsidiaries in Liverpool, Manchester, Bradford, Dundee, Huddersfield, Leeds, Leicester, London and Wolverhampton went into administration in March.

As of April 2013, much of the various sub companies in the group were in the hands of administrators with various property management companies brought in to oversee the developments whilst buyers were sought.

Properties
Opal's properties include:
Birmingham - Opal 1 in Highgate
Leeds
Opal 1
Opal 2
Opal Tower (Opal 3)
Leicester - halls of residence including Opal Court, which was nominated for the 2007 Carbuncle Cup
London
Opal 1 in Hoxton (University of the Arts London)
Opal 2 in Greenwich
Opal 3 in Holloway
Opal 4 in Tufnell Park
Manchester - accommodation blocks around Whitworth Street
Nottingham - halls of residence with common room and gymnasium
Newport - Opal 1
Sheffield
Opal 1 near the Devonshire Quarter
Opal 2 in Netherthorpe (now called "Allen Court" and run by Greystar Real Estate Partners)
Opal 3, also in Netherthorpe

References

Property companies of the United Kingdom